The Roscommon Junior Football Championship is an annual Gaelic Athletic Association competition between lower-tier football clubs in County Roscommon. The winning club (or the best placed first-team) qualifies to represent its county in the Connacht Junior Club Football Championship. The 2021 Championship was won by St Brigid's B, who defeated Padraig Pearses B in the final, by 2-14 to 0-4.

Qualification for subsequent competitions

Connacht Junior Club Football Championship
The Roscommon JFC winners qualify for the Connacht Junior Club Football Championship. It is the only team from County Roscommon to qualify for this competition. The Roscommon JFC winners enter the Connacht Junior Club Football Championship at the quarter-final stage. For example, 2013 winner Fuerty qualified for the Connacht final and won that game against a Galway club, from a traditionally larger county. That was the first time this competition's winner also won the Connacht final since Tulsk did so in 2004.

All-Ireland Junior Club Football Championship
The Roscommon JFC winners — by winning the Connacht Junior Club Football Championship — may qualify for the All-Ireland Junior Club Football Championship, at which they would enter at the semi-final stage, providing they haven't been drawn to face the British champions in the quarter-finals.

Trophy

Venue
The final is traditionally held at ?.

Roll of honour

*Denotes wins by club's second-team

Records unavailable for 1929, 1934, 1936–38, 1941, 1946–47, 1949, 1951,1955, 1958–59, 1961–61, 1964, 1968–72, 1976, 1978–79, 1981

References

External links
 Official Roscommon Website
 Roscommon on Hoganstand

Roscommon GAA club championships